The Congaree were a historic group of Native Americans who once lived within what is now central South Carolina, along the Congaree River.  They spoke a language distinct from and not mutually intelligible with other local Siouan languages. The language today is generally considered unclassified, though, some linguists believe that the language was related to Catawba. The tribe joined the Catawba Nation in company of the Wateree several years after temporarily migrating to the Waccamaw River in 1732. During the middle of the eighteenth century, Congaree was considered one of the languages spoken within the Catawba Nation.

Unclassified language

Early European observer, John Lawson, noted that members of the Congaree tribe were distinguishable from other nearby tribes by their appearance, customs, and language. During the late nineteenth and early twentieth centuries, American scholars thought the Congaree were likely part of the Siouan language family, given their geographic location and characteristics of neighboring tribes like the Catawba.

Since the late twentieth century, scholars have suggested that the Congaree people did not speak a Siouan language due to their language not being intelligble to their immediate Siouan speaking neighbors, the Wateree. Linguist Blair A. Rudes suggested that the name "Congaree" is possibly a rendering of kųkari• Catawban for 'over there, out of sight'. He noted that if this is the case, the name is an exonym and not the name members of the tribe would have called themselves.

History
The Congaree lived along the Santee and Congaree rivers, above and below the confluence of the Wateree River, in central South Carolina. According to James Mooney's 1894 history of the Siouan tribes, the Congaree occupied territory between the Santee tribe downriver of them and the Wateree tribe above.

In Native American practice, people taken as captives in warfare, particularly women and children, were often kept or sold as slaves. English and European colonists encouraged the tribes to take and sell Indian captives into their domestic slave trade. By 1693, the Congaree, Esaw and Savannah slave-catchers had pursued the Cherokee as "objects of the slave trade to the extent that a tribal delegation was sent" to Governor Thomas Smith. They sought protection, claiming that Cherokee had been sold in the Charles Town slave market.

In 1698, the Congaree lost "most tribe members to smallpox." The Native Americans suffered high mortality from new infectious diseases that had become endemic for centuries among Europeans, leading to some acquired immunity for the latter.
 
The English explorer John Lawson encountered the survivors in 1701, apparently on the northeastern bank of the Santee River below the junction of the Wateree. Lawson described their village as consisting of about a dozen houses, located on a small creek flowing into the Santee River. He described them as a small tribe, having lost population because of tribal feuds and raids, but more especially by smallpox, which had depopulated whole villages. A 1715 map shows their village as located on the southern bank of the Congaree and considerably above the previous area, perhaps near Big Beaver creek, or about opposite the future site of Columbia, on the eastern boundary of Lexington County. They may have been moving upriver to get further from English colonists.

During the Tuscarora War of 1711, the Congaree fought on the side of English colonist John Barnwell, who raised a militia. In early 1715 John Barnwell took a census, which identified the Congaree as living in one village, with a total population of 22 men and 70 women and children.

During the Yamasee War of 1715, the Congaree joined with other tribes in the fight against the colony of South Carolina. Over half were either killed or enslaved by the colonists and Cherokee; some were sent into slavery in the West Indies. Following that, surviving Congaree moved upriver and joined the Catawba, with whom they were still living in 1743.

In 1718, Fort Congaree was established near the Congaree village, near today's Columbia. It became an important trading station and a European-American settlement formed around it.

In the subsequent decades, Congaree survivors merged with the larger Catawba people.  Different tribes lived in their own villages within the loose Catawba federation of peoples.  The Congaree maintained their distinction until the late 18th century, as they had a language different from the Siouan Catawba, but they became extinct as a tribe. Their descendants intermarried with the Catawba and other peoples of the confederation.

Based on colonial accounts, American anthropologist James Mooney (1928) described the historic Congaree as: "A friendly people, handsome and well built, the women being especially beautiful compared with those of other tribes."

Keyauwee Jack, a Congaree by birth, became chief of the Keyauwee by marriage.

Legacy 
Some members of the present-day Catawba and other tribes of the Carolinas are likely genetic descendants of the Congaree, among others.

Namesakes of the tribe include: 
Congaree River
Congaree Creek
Congaree National Park 
South Congaree, South Carolina
USS Congaree (IX-84)

References

External links
 "Conagree", South Carolina Indians
 "The Congaree", SCGenWeb
 

Extinct Native American peoples
Indigenous peoples of the Southeastern Woodlands
Native American tribes in South Carolina
Unclassified languages of North America